John Fletcher Steele (June 7, 1885 – July 16, 1971) was an American landscape architect credited with designing and creating over 700 gardens from 1915 to the time of his death.

Early life 

Steele was born in Rochester, New York, United States to a lawyer father and pianist mother. He graduated with a B.A. from Williams College in 1907. While there, he was a member of the fraternity of Delta Psi (St. Anthony Hall). He then enrolled in the young landscape architecture program at Harvard University where Frederick Law Olmsted, Jr. was one of his professors. In 1908 Steele left Harvard to accept an apprenticeship with Warren H. Manning.

Career 

In 1913 Steele embarked on a four-month tour of Europe to study European designs. Upon his return to America, he opened his own practice. His early garden plans are generally in the English Arts and crafts style of Gertrude Jekyll, Reginald Blomfield, and T. H. Mawson, but ornamented with Italianate detailing such as balustrades, hedges, urns, statuary, stone pineapples, and flights of water steps. During World War I, Steele served in the American Red Cross in Europe. After war's end he regularly returned in summers.

His conversion to an Art Deco style began in 1925 when he visited the Exposition Internationale des Arts Décoratifs et Industriels Modernes (the 'Art Deco Exposition') and saw its examples of cubist gardens with mirrors, concrete  and coloured gravel. By 1930 Steele was writing with enthusiasm of André Vera, Tony Garnier (architect), and Gabriel Guevrekian.

Steele's designs and writings of this period were influential during the stylistic transition from Art Deco to Modernism. He helped shape Modernism through younger design students at Harvard, notably Dan Kiley, Garrett Eckbo, and James C. Rose, to who Steele showed the possibilities of modern art and the creativity inherent within the design process. Kiley later wrote that "Steele was the only good designer working during the twenties and thirties, also the only one who was really interested in new things." Eckbo noted that "Fletcher Steele was the transitional figure between the old guard and the moderns. He interests me because he was an experimenter." Steele's own designs, however, were sufficiently removed from the Modern style so that his works were generally out of fashion until the modern era had passed.

Steele is interred in the Mount Hope Cemetery in Rochester, New York. His papers are archived in the Library of Congress, the Rochester Historical Society and in the Franklin Moon Library, State University of New York College of Environmental Science and Forestry, Syracuse, New York.Images from the Steele manuscript collection can be found in the SUNY D-Space digital repository.

Projects 
Steele is noted for a number of major works including Naumkeag, Peters Reservation, Ancrum House, Whitney Allen House, Standish Backus House, Turner House, Lisburne Grange.  His most famous work by far is Naumkeag.

These projects were not all viewed with high regard at the time, and only relatively recently have historians begun to appreciate Steele's impact on garden design and landscape architecture.

Selected writing 
 Design in the little garden, Boston, The Atlantic Monthly Press, 1924.
 The House beautiful gardening manual; a comprehensive guide, æsthetic and practical, for all garden lovers, both those who are still planning their gardens on paper and those who have had gardening experience, including plant lists compiled with the help of horticulturalists in all sections of the country, and an introductory chapter on garden design by Fletcher Steele, Boston, The Atlantic monthly press, 1926.
 Gardens and people, Boston, Houghton Mifflin, 1964.

References 

 Robin Karson, Fletcher Steele, Landscape Architect: An Account of the Gardenmaker's Life, 1885-1971, Timber Press, 1989. .
 Robin Karson, Fletcher Steele, Landscape Architect: An Account of the Gardenmaker's Life, 1885-1971, Rev. Ed. Amherst : Library of American Landscape History : Distributed by University of Massachusetts Press, c2003. .

External links and sources 
The Fletcher Steele Archives at the SUNY College of Environmental Science and Forestry
www.gardenvisit.com
GoldsmithBirdhouses.com Birdhouse reproduction from Fletcher Steele design
Fletcher Steele at Naumkeag An online film on Fletcher Steele's designs at Naumkeag in Stockbridge, Massachusetts
Fletcher J. Steele Papers at Williams College Archives & Special Collections 

American landscape architects
American landscape and garden designers
1885 births
1971 deaths
Burials at Mount Hope Cemetery (Rochester)
Williams College alumni
Brigham Young University alumni
Landscape design history of the United States
State University of New York College of Environmental Science and Forestry people
Harvard Graduate School of Design alumni
St. Anthony Hall